Elections were held in the state of Western Australia on 24 April 1901 to elect 50 members to the Western Australian Legislative Assembly. It was the first election to take place since responsible government without the towering presence of Premier Sir John Forrest, who had left state politics two months earlier to enter the first Federal parliament representing the Division of Swan, and the first state parliamentary election to follow the enactment of women's suffrage in 1899.

The Ministerial group, led by Forrest's nominated successor George Throssell, ran a half-hearted campaign for government, with Throssell saying in a policy speech that while he would continue to serve as Premier if required, "it was not the class of political life he desired, as it interfered too much with his leisure." Meanwhile, the Opposition had no clear leader, with the Parliamentary leader Frederick Illingworth and George Leake, who was seeking to return to Parliament in the election, both apparently contenders. The groups were neither formal nor organised, with many members and candidates professing rather confused allegiances and running their own campaigns on local issues.

Following the introduction of payment of members in 1900, which effectively allowed electors without independent means to sit in Parliament, the Labour Party offered 22 candidates to the voters compared to three at the previous election, each of which was pledged to the party's platform. The Westralian Worker newspaper, launched six months earlier, was used to publicise the campaign. They ultimately won six seats, of which five were located in the Goldfields.

No clear winner emerged, and considerable instability resulted as three Ministries either resigned or were defeated on a want of confidence motion. The situation was ultimately resolved when half of the Morgans Ministry were defeated in ministerial by-elections in December 1901, which gave the Opposition a narrow majority with Independent or Labour support.

The election took place based on boundaries established in the Constitution Act Amendment Act 1899, which increased the number of members from 44 to 50 and reflected demographic changes—the Pilbara region lost two seats as did the Murchison region, whilst five seats were created in Kalgoorlie and the Eastern Goldfields and four seats were created in the Perth metropolitan area. The election was conducted under the first past the post system, and electorates had a wide variety of numbers of enrolled voters, ranging from 108 at East Kimberley to 7,024 at Hannans—nine electorates had 500 or less, whilst the same number had 3,000 or more.

Results

|}

See also
 Members of the Western Australian Legislative Assembly, 1897–1901
 Members of the Western Australian Legislative Assembly, 1901–1904

Notes
 The total number of enrolled voters was 91,525, of whom 8,780 were registered in nine uncontested seats—five of which were won by Ministerialists, three by Oppositionists and one by an Independent. The substantial rise in the number of voters from the 1897 election, where 23,318 voters were enrolled, reflected changes to eligibility criteria, including the enactment of women's suffrage, in the Constitution Act Amendment Act 1899.
 Many supporters of the former Ministry, as argued by de Garis (Stannage, p.348), who eschewed party politics on principle but could be counted on to support the Ministerialist group, went to the election as Independents. This may partly explain the apparent disparity of votes to seats won in the election.

References

Elections in Western Australia
1901 elections in Australia
1900s in Western Australia
April 1901 events